Roger Anthony Fairfax Jr. is an American legal scholar.

Family
Roger Fairfax Jr. is the eldest son of Roger Sr. and Charlene Fairfax. Fairfax Jr.'s youngest brother, Justin Fairfax, served as lieutenant governor of Virginia from 2018 to 2022. The Fairfax family can trace its ancestry to Simon Fairfax, a slave freed by Thomas Fairfax, 9th Lord Fairfax of Cameron.

Roger Fairfax Jr. and his wife Lisa Fairfax raised three children.

Career
Roger Fairfax Jr. attended Harvard College before completing a master's degree from the University of London. He also attended Archbishop Carroll High School in Washington, D.C. While a student at Harvard Law School, Fairfax edited the Harvard Law Review. He was a law clerk for Patti B. Saris and later Judith W. Rogers. Fairfax is an elected member of the American Law Institute. Fairfax was a federal prosecutor and worked for O'Melveny & Myers before joining the George Washington University Law School faculty, where he served as Patricia Roberts Harris Research Professor of Law until 2021, when he was appointed dean of the Washington College of Law at American University. Fairfax is also the chair of Archbishop Carroll High School’s Board of Directors.

References

21st-century American lawyers
Deans of law schools in the United States
African-American academic administrators
African-American legal scholars
African-American lawyers
21st-century African-American academics
21st-century American academics
Members of the American Law Institute
Washington College of Law faculty
George Washington University Law School faculty
Harvard Law School alumni
Harvard College alumni
Alumni of the University of London
American expatriates in the United Kingdom
Living people
Year of birth missing (living people)